Lungotevere dei Pierleoni is the stretch of lungotevere which links piazza di Monte Savello to ponte Palatino, in Rome, in rione Ripa.

This lungotevere is named after the ancient Roman family of the Pierleoni, which owned houses, towers and a fortress on the shore of the Tevere; it was instituted with law of 20 July 1887.

Note

Sources 

Pierleoni
Streets in Rome R. XII Ripa